This article presents a list of the historical events and publications of Australian literature during 1910.

Books 
 Mary Gaunt – The Uncounted Cost
 Fergus Hume – High Water Mark
 G. B. Lancaster – Jim of the Ranges
 Rosa Praed – Opal Fire
 Ambrose Pratt – The Living Mummy
 Henry Handel Richardson – The Getting of Wisdom
 Ethel Turner – Fair Ines
 Lilian Turner – Three New Chum Girls

Short stories 
 Arthur Bayldon – The Tragedy Behind the Curtain and Other Stories
 James Francis Dwyer – "A Jungle Graduate"
 Henry Lawson – The Rising of the Court and Other Sketches in Prose and Verse
 Sumner Locke – "When Dawson Died"
 Steele Rudd
 The Dashwoods
 On an Australian Farm
 Thomas Edward Spencer – The Haunted Shanty and Other Stories

Poetry 

 E. J. Brady – Bush-Land Ballads
 C. J. Dennis – "An Old Master"
 Louis Esson – Bells and Bees: Verses
 Mary Gilmore – Marri'd and Other Verses
 Henry Lawson – The Skyline Riders and Other Verses
 Frederic Manning – Poems
 John Shaw Neilson
 "The Girl with the Black Hair"
 "Surely God was a Lover"
 "You, and Yellow Air"
 Bernard O'Dowd – "The Poet"

Drama
 John Le Gay Brereton – Tomorrow
 Katharine Susannah Prichard – The Burglar

Births 

A list, ordered by date of birth (and, if the date is either unspecified or repeated, ordered alphabetically by surname) of births in 1910 of Australian literary figures, authors of written works or literature-related individuals follows, including year of death.

 21 March – Elizabeth Riddell, poet (died 1998)
 21 June – Clive Sansom, poet and dramatist (died 1981)
 22 July – Alan Moorehead, journalist (died 1983)
 31 August – Joan Colebrook, journalist and writer (died 1991)

Deaths 

A list, ordered by date of death (and, if the date is either unspecified or repeated, ordered alphabetically by surname) of deaths in 1910 of Australian literary figures, authors of written works or literature-related individuals follows, including year of birth.

 18 January – James Lister Cuthbertson, poet (born 1851)
 3 April – Catherine Helen Spence, novelist (born 1825)
 6 May – Thomas Edward Spencer, poet and novelist (born 1845)

Unknown Date
Mary Fortune — poet, crime fiction and short story writer (born 1833)

See also 
 1910 in poetry
 List of years in literature
 List of years in Australian literature
 1910 in literature
 1909 in Australian literature
 1910 in Australia
 1911 in Australian literature

References

Literature
Australian literature by year
20th-century Australian literature